Senator Broome may refer to:

John Broome (politician) (1738–1810), New York State Senate
Sharon Weston Broome (born 1956), Louisiana State Senate